Coker v. Georgia, 433 U.S. 584 (1977), held that the death penalty for rape of an adult woman was grossly disproportionate and excessive punishment, and therefore unconstitutional under the Eighth Amendment to the U.S. Constitution. A few states continued to have child rape statutes that authorized the death penalty. In Kennedy v. Louisiana (2008), the court expanded Coker, ruling that the death penalty is unconstitutional in all cases that do not involve homicide or crimes against the State.

Background
While serving several sentences for rape, kidnapping, one count of first degree murder, and aggravated assault, Ehrlich Anthony Coker escaped from prison. He  broke into Allen and Elnita Carver's home near Waycross, Georgia; raped Elnita Carver, and stole the family's vehicle. Coker was convicted of rape, armed robbery, and the other offenses. 

He was sentenced to death on the rape charge after the jury found two of the aggravating circumstances present for imposing such a sentence: the rape was committed by a person with prior convictions for capital felonies, and the rape was committed in the course of committing another capital felony, the armed robbery. The Supreme Court of Georgia upheld the death sentence.

Decision

Plurality

Justice White wrote the plurality opinion, on behalf of Justices Stewart, Blackmun, and Stevens.

The Court's proportionality jurisprudence is informed by objective evidence, which comes from the laws enacted by state legislatures and the behavior of sentencing juries. The Court had found that it was always a minority of states that allowed the death penalty for rape.

In 1925, 18 of 48 states, the District of Columbia, and the federal government authorized the death penalty for rape of an adult woman. 

In 1963, the figure was 17 of 50 states, almost all of them in the Southern and Western United States, as well as the District of Columbia and the federal government.

By 1971, on the eve of the Court's Furman decision, the number of jurisdictions supporting the death penalty for rape of an adult woman had declined to 16 states and the federal government. When Furman forced the states to rewrite their capital sentencing laws, only three states (Georgia, North Carolina, and Louisiana) retained the death penalty for rape of an adult woman.

In 1976, the capital sentencing laws of North Carolina and Louisiana were struck down for a different reason. In response to the reversals, the legislatures of North Carolina and Louisiana did not retain the death penalty for rape. Thus, at the time of the Coker decision, only Georgia retained the death penalty for the crime of rape of an adult woman.

At the time of decision, the Supreme Court of Georgia had reviewed 63 rape cases. Only six of these involved a death sentence. The Georgia court had set aside one, leaving five death sentences for rape intact from among all the rape convictions obtained since Furman. From the statistical evidence, the Court concluded that in at least 90% of rape cases, the jury did not impose a death sentence. The objective evidence, state death penalty laws, and behavior of juries, suggested that the death penalty for rape was rare.

But objective evidence does not dictate the outcome of the Court's proportionality analysis. The Court also brings to bear its estimation of how the death penalty in the circumstances in question would serve the goals of retribution and deterrence. Rape is a serious crime: "short of homicide, it is the ultimate violation of self." It typically involves violence and injury, both physical and psychological, but the Court denied that it involves "serious" injury: "Rape is without doubt deserving of serious punishment; but in terms of moral depravity and of the injury to the person and to the public, it does not compare with murder, which does involve the unjustified taking of human life." In light of such facts, the Court concluded that death was an excessive punishment for "the rapist who, as such, does not take human life."

The fact that the jury had found that two aggravating factors applied to Coker's crime (his prior convictions and the fact that the rape was committed during the course of a robbery) did not change the Court's conclusion. The rape may have been committed during the course of another crime and by a hardened criminal, but the rape did not escalate into a killing. Finally, even a deliberate killing does not merit a death sentence under Georgia law without the finding of aggravating factors.

Concurring opinion
Justices Brennan and Marshall concurred in the judgment because the case struck down a death penalty, in keeping with their view that the death penalty is per se cruel and unusual punishment.

Concurring/dissenting
Justice Powell concurred in the judgment, but he emphasized that the death penalty may be appropriate for rape if there are aggravating circumstances.

Dissenting
Chief Justice Burger, joined by Justice Rehnquist, dissented because he believed that the proportionality principle the Court had engrafted onto the Eighth Amendment encroached too much on the legislative power of the states. Burger preferred to concentrate on the narrow facts of the case: was it proper for Georgia to impose the death penalty on Coker, a man who had escaped from prison while serving a sentence for murder and raped another young woman? "Whatever one's view may be as to the State's constitutional power to impose the death penalty upon a rapist who stands before the court convicted for the first time, this case reveals a chronic rapist whose continuing danger to the community is abundantly clear."

Burger defended a state's prerogative to impose additional punishment for recidivists, including a death sentence for prisoners who commit crimes. Congress had enacted an early three-strikes law, and the federal crime of assault on a mail carrier carried a stiffer penalty for a second such offense. Other states also carried harsher penalties for "habitual criminality." He believed that "the Eighth Amendment does not prevent the State from taking an individual's 'well-demonstrated propensity for life-endangering behavior' into account in devising punitive measures which will prevent inflicting further harm upon innocent victims."

If the Court was serious about sanctioning the continued use of the death penalty, it should allow states to use it in appropriate circumstances.

Furthermore, rape is a heinous crime: "A rapist not only violates a victim's privacy and personal integrity, but inevitably causes serious psychological as well as physical harm in the process. The long-range effect upon the victim's life and health is likely to be irreparable; it is impossible to measure the harm which results." He disagreed with the Court's conclusion that there were no circumstances under which it was a proportional response to crime. Such a conclusion turned the Court into "the ultimate arbiter of the standards of criminal responsibility in diverse areas of the criminal law throughout the country." That was an inappropriate role for the Court to assume in the American federal system. He felt that Furman had injected enough uncertainty into the debate over capital punishment; it was more expedient to allow subsequent legislative developments to evolve.

Burger disagreed with the Court's assessment of the retribution and deterrence value of the death penalty for rape. He thought that the death penalty might deter at least one prospective rapist. It might encourage victims to report the crime. It might increase the general feeling of security among members of the community. The fact that the magnitude of the harm caused by the murderer is greater than that caused by the rapist was beside the point. The Eighth Amendment was not the Code of Hammurabi; if "innocent life and limb are to be preserved I see no constitutional barrier in punishing by death all who engage in... criminal activity which consistently poses serious danger of death or serious bodily harm." Thus, the Court had no place dictating how the states might make law in the criminal arena.

Aftermath
The direct consequence was the overturning of the Georgia death sentences of Coker and five other rapists, including John W. Hooks, John W. Eberheart, Donald Boyer, and William J. Hughes.

Florida, Mississippi, and Tennessee had capital rape statutes authorizing the death penalty or life imprisonment for the rape of children. 

The Tennessee Supreme Court overturned its child rape statutes in 1977 because of Woodson (1976). 

In 1977 Florida sentenced to death child rapist William H. Shue. The state's Supreme Court vacated the sentence in 1978 and ordered him returned to the Ocala Circuit Court for resentencing. While declining to rule on the overall question of capital punishment for child rape, the court said there had been no showing in Shue's case of "extraordinary cruelty or of violence or injury to the young victims." The court noted that Judge Swigert had imposed the death penalty, although the jury that had convicted Shue had sentenced him to life imprisonment. Daniel Coler was sentenced to death in 1978 in Florida for the rape of his daughter as a child. Coler's death sentence was overturned in 1982 because the court found that irrelevant and prejudicial testimony had been introduced in his case, preventing a fair trial. The state said that it would not retry him, as the victim did not want to testify and the other chief witness had died in an auto accident. Coler was set free after 4 1/2 years on death row. 

On the basis of Coker, the Florida Supreme Court ruled that Florida capital child rape statutes were unconstitutional in the Robert L. Buford case of 1981 and the Lucious L. Andrews case in 1983. Before his sentence was overturned, Andrews was the last man on death row who had not murdered anyone.

The Mississippi Supreme Court overturned Mississippi capital rape statutes in 1989, in its ruling in Leatherwood v. State. It dismissed Alfred D. Leatherwood's death sentence on another basis, the fact that the Louisiana capital aggravators were written to apply only to capital murder and not to rape.

The main consequence of Coker was that the death penalty was largely restricted to crimes in which the defendant caused the death of another human being.

Until Kennedy v. Louisiana, some states were testing the limit of this restriction by enacting death penalty statutes for repeat child rapists. In terms of the Court's capital punishment jurisprudence, Coker signaled the Court's commitment to employing a robust proportionality test for deciding when the death penalty would be an appropriate punishment. The Court would later use this same proportionality test to evaluate the propriety of the death penalty for felony murder (except for the actual killer), mentally retarded offenders, juvenile offenders, and eventually all nonhomicide crimes and crimes against the state.

Coker
Erlich Coker (his given name is also spelled as Ehrlech, according to the Georgia Department of Corrections; under the GDC ID 0000379279) is still serving multiple life sentences at the Walker State Prison, Georgia as of 2021.

Kennedy case
Kennedy v. Louisiana was a decision by the Louisiana Supreme Court that reached the United States Supreme Court; its litigation expanded the Coker decision.

On May 22, 2007, the Louisiana Supreme Court held that it is constitutional to impose the death penalty for rape if the victim is a child. Ruling on an appeal brought in the case of defendant Patrick Kennedy, Justice Jeffrey Victory wrote for the court that the Louisiana law allowing the imposition of the death penalty under those circumstances was consistent with Coker because an aggravating circumstance, the age of the victim, justified the death penalty.

The case was struck down by the US Supreme Court in Kennedy v. Louisiana (2008), thus expanding Coker. The court ruled that the death penalty is unconstitutional in all cases that do not involve murder or crimes against the State.

See also
List of United States Supreme Court cases, volume 433

Notes

References

External links
 
Struck by Lightning: Louisiana's Electrocutions for Rape in the Forties and Fifties from Burk Foster

United States Supreme Court cases
United States Supreme Court cases of the Burger Court
Cruel and Unusual Punishment Clause and death penalty case law
Capital punishment in Georgia (U.S. state)
Legal history of Georgia (U.S. state)
1977 in United States case law
Rape in the United States
History of women in Georgia (U.S. state)